Jimmy Connors and Ilie Năstase were the defending champions but only Ilie Năstase competed that year with Vitas Gerulaitis. 
Vitas Gerulaitis and Ilie Năstase lost in the second round to Paul Kronk and Cliff Letcher.

Tom Okker and Marty Riessen won in the final 6–4, 6–4 against Paul Kronk and Cliff Letcher.

Seeds

Draw

Finals

Top half

Section 1

Section 2

Bottom half

Section 3

Section 4

References

External links
 ATP main draw
1976 US Open – Men's draws and results at the International Tennis Federation

Men's doubles
US Open (tennis) by year – Men's doubles